Luká is a municipality and village in Olomouc District in the Olomouc Region of the Czech Republic. It has about 900 inhabitants.

Administrative parts
Villages of Březina, Javoříčko, Ješov, Střemeníčko and Veselíčko are administrative parts of Luká.

History
The first written mention of Luká is from 1313.

On 5 May 1945, the hamlet of Javoříčko was burned down by the SS and all 38 men were shot dead.

References

Villages in Olomouc District